Meadowvale may refer to:

Meadowvale, Ontario, a community of Mississauga, Ontario, Canada
Meadowvale (village), a residential subdivision near the community
Meadowvale GO Station, a station in the GO Transit network located in the community
Meadowvale Secondary School, a high school in the Peel District School Board in Mississauga, Ontario, Canada
Meadowvale Town Centre Bus Terminal
Meadowvale Road, a street in Toronto